Schaber is a surname. Notable people with the surname include:

Caleb Schaber (1973–2009), American artist and journalist
Penny Bernard Schaber, Democratic Party member of the Wisconsin State Assembly, elected in 2008

See also 
3333 Schaber, asteroid 
Wayne Schaab

German-language surnames